Arzecla is a Neotropical butterfly genus in the family Lycaenidae, formerly part of Lamprospilus.

Species
Arzecla albolineata (Lathy, 1936) Colombia.
Arzecla arza (Hewitson, 1874) Mexico, Nicaragua et au Brazil.
Arzecla calatia (Hewitson, 1873) Mexico, Guatemala, Nicaragua Guyane.
Arzecla canacha (Hewitson, 1877) Venezuela.
Arzecla nubilum (H. Druce, 1907) Brazil.
Arzecla paralus (Godman & Salvin, 1887) Guatemala, Costa Rica Venezuela.
Arzecla sethon (Godman & Salvin, 1887) Mexico.
Arzecla taminella (Schaus, 1902) Brazil, Guyane.
Arzecla tarpa (Godman & Salvin, 1887) Mexico,  Panama.
Arzecla tucumanensis (K. Johnson & Kroenlein, 1993) Argentina

References
Duarte, M. & R.K. Robbins, 2010 Description and phylogenetic analysis of the Calycopidina (Lepidoptera, Lycaenidae, Theclinae, Eumaeini): a subtribe of detritivores. Revista Brasileira de Entomologia 54 (1): 45-64. Full article: .

Eumaeini
Lycaenidae of South America
Lycaenidae genera